Sim Shagaya is a Nigerian media and technology entrepreneur. He is the founder and CEO of uLesson Education Limited - an app built to make education available to learners across Africa. He is the founder and former C.E.O of one of West Africa's largest electronic commerce website Konga.com and founder of E-Motion Advertising - a leading out-of-home media company acquired in 2019 by Loadstad Media. In 2014, he was named in Forbes' list of "10 Most Powerful Men in Africa".

In August 2019, Sim Shagaya was invited to and accepted to serve as a member of the Economic Advisory Council of the Executive Governor of his home town, Plateau State, Samuel Lalong.

Early life and education
Sim Shagaya was born in Nigeria where he served in the Nigerian Army after completing the Nigerian Military School. He completed most of his education in the US. He is a graduate of George Washington University and holds a Masters of Engineering degree from Dartmouth College. He also graduated with an MBA from Harvard Business School in 2003.

Career

Early career
Prior to the establishment of DealDey and Konga.com, Sim worked as a banker in South Africa under Rand Merchant Bank. He later moved to Nigeria where he became Google's head for Africa and went on to found a Lagos-based billboard advertising business called E-Motion in November 2005. Sim sits on the Economic Advisory Council of Plateau State, Nigeria. He cites Hakeem Belo-Osagie as the "biggest impact" in his career.

DealDey and Konga.com
Before Sim started DealDey and Konga.com, he created several websites like Alarena, Jobclan, Gbogbo and iNollyWood which were relatively unsuccessful. In March 2011, DealDey was launched after he convinced the board of the billboard
company he owned to invest in DealDey. On 3 July 2012, he founded Konga.com with a capital from Swedish investment firm Kinnevik. According to Sim Shagaya, the primary aim of Konga.com is to "aggregate the youngest and fastest-growing market that was dispersed, under-served and that traditional retailers were simply failing to reach".

uLesson Education Limited 
He founded the uLesson educational platform in 2020.

Awards and recognition

References

1976 births
Living people
20th-century Nigerian businesspeople
21st-century Nigerian businesspeople
Harvard Business School alumni
George Washington University alumni
Dartmouth College alumni
Nigerian chief executives